The ECO Funnel, also known as the "Safety Ecological Funnel", is a funnel intended to be affixed to a receptacle for liquid chemical waste. It is designed to reduce environmental contamination, in compliance with OSHA and EPA mandated safety protocols.

Origin

The ECO Funnel was first devised by Dr. Ron Najafi in 1996 while he was working at a facility in the San Francisco Bay Area. At that facility, complaints arose throughout the building of odorous fumes originating from the laboratory. This raised the alarm that contamination was not limited to the laboratory where chemical waste is stored, and an investigation was initiated. 

As a member of the company's Health and Safety Committee, Dr. Najafi conducted tests to determine the severity of emissions from waste bottles typically left unsealed beneath a fume hood. By marking the rapid decrease in waste bottle volume over a limited period, he was able to verify that significant amounts of potentially hazardous chemicals were evaporating into the surrounding environment.

Once the source and severity of the situation had been confirmed, a need was recognized to improve standard practice for the safety of lab personnel and to bring laboratories into adherence to public safety protocols such as those outlined by the Occupational Safety & Health Administration (OSHA) or the US Environmental Protection Agency (EPA):

    29 CFR 1910.1450:  “Avoidance of routine exposure: develop and encourage safe habits; avoid unnecessary exposure to chemicals by any route.”
    29 CFR 1910.1450:  “Indiscriminate disposal by pouring waste chemicals down the drain or adding them to mixed refuse for landfill burial is unacceptable. Hoods should not be used as a means of disposal for volatile chemicals.”
    40 CFR 264.173:  “A container holding hazardous waste must always be closed during storage except with it is necessary to add or remove waste.”
    40 CFR 264.175:  “The containment system must have sufficient capacity to contain 10% of the volume of containers or the volume of the largest container, whichever is greater...”
    29 CFR 1910.1450:  “Stockrooms/Storerooms: ...chemicals which are highly toxic or other chemicals whose containers have been opened should be in unbreakable secondary containers...

Environmental regulations regarding waste containers were at this time becoming more rigorously enforced than previously, making the situation urgent. After researching available options, it became clear that no solution existed to the problem of effectively containing chemical waste evaporation aside from re-capping original waste containers after each use. In response to his findings, Dr. Najafi created the ECO Funnel.

Concept
The current design of the ECO Funnel utilizes a latching lid with gasket and two internal tubes. One larger and longer tube extends into the container from the base of the funnel into the liquid waste to restrict the surface area of the contents and inhibit fume emission. The other tube is designed to sit above the liquid level as a means to warn against overfilling. When the ECO Funnel is secured to a container, this second shorter and smaller tube provides the only ventilation. When the volume of liquid inside the container reaches the smaller tube opening, it will obstruct the airflow through the smaller tube; the waste fluid backs up into the funnel to signal the user that the container is at capacity. Detaching the ECO Funnel allows the remaining liquid to flow into the container and be safely sealed inside. So long as the ECO Funnel's contents do not exceed the maximum volume indicated, the liquid will drain into the container without overflowing.

Impact

The ECO Funnel resolves a long-standing incongruity between federally mandated safety protocol and standard laboratory practice. The traditional method for handling fluid waste is to set a standard funnel onto the mouth of an open bottle, which is sometimes stored under a fume hood. This is out of compliance with OSHA 29 CFR 1910.1450 and EPA 40 CFR 264.173. Testing confirms that these methods allow chemicals to evaporate, contaminating the surrounding atmosphere and posing a health risk not only to laboratory workers but to neighboring areas. Additionally, chemical contaminants in the atmosphere, in combination with normal oxygen levels in the lab, fulfill two of the three components necessary to complete the fire triangle. Further, chemical spills in the laboratory preclude procedures of safe disposal, leading these toxins to end up in landfills, and consequently, soil, rivers, and oceans. As plant and animal life are affected, the consequences escalate exponentially.

References 

Pollution control technologies
Laboratory equipment
Environmental design